Franz Inthaler (26 September 1940 – 14 January 2004) was an Austrian cyclist who was active between 1959 and 1974. In 1960 he finished third at the Tour of Austria. He was the brother of Fritz Inthaler, who was also a cyclist.

References

1940 births
2004 deaths
Austrian male cyclists
Cyclists from Vienna
20th-century Austrian people